Peter J. Ratchuk (born September 10, 1977) is an American former professional ice hockey defenseman who played in the National Hockey League with the Florida Panthers. Peter is the older brother of Mike Ratchuk, a defenseman who has played most of his career in American minor leagues.

Playing career
Ratchuk was drafted in the first round, 25th overall, by the Colorado Avalanche in the 1996 NHL Entry Draft. He grew up playing for the Cazenovia Chiefs. After his freshman year with Bowling Green State University, Ratchuk moved to the QMJHL with Hull Olympiques before turning pro.

Ratchuk was signed as a free agent by the Florida Panthers prior to the 1998–99 season.  He played 32 games with the Panthers over two seasons, 1998–99 and 2000–01.  He scored one goal and one assist.

After that, he was picked up by his hometown team, the Buffalo Sabres. During the 2002 preseason,  he was sent down to that team's farm club, the Rochester Americans, for the 2002–03 season, then left to play in Germany. This resulted in a rather amusing error in ESPN's hockey recaps—in Sabres game recaps, Ratchuk's name would often be used mistakenly to refer to Dmitri Kalinin, a then current Sabres defenseman. Both Ratchuk and Kalinin wore #45, and ESPN never dissociated Ratchuk from the Sabres in their database when he left the league, resulting in the error.

After playing three seasons in Germany's DEL, Ratchuk returned to North America in 2006–07 signing with the Minnesota Wild on June 6, 2006. Ratchuk split the season between the American Hockey League's Houston Aeros and Wilkes-Barre/Scranton Penguins. Ratchuk then returned to the DEL with the DEG Metro Stars and after his second season with the Stars he was released on April 20, 2009. On June 21, 2009 Peter signed with fellow DEL team Hamburg Freezers for the 2009–10.

On April 29, 2010, after failing to make the playoffs with the Freezers, Ratchuk left for the Austrian Hockey League's Klagenfurt AC. He played the majority of the 2010-11 season with Klagenfurt posting 19 points in 39 games before leaving for the Swiss National League A, to join Rapperswil-Jona Lakers on January 30, 2011, to end the year.

Following the conclusion of the season, Ratchuk retired and was announced as a scout for the newly revived Winnipeg Jets association of the NHL.

Career statistics

References

External links

1977 births
Adler Mannheim players
American men's ice hockey defensemen
Beast of New Haven players
Bowling Green Falcons men's ice hockey players
Colorado Avalanche draft picks
DEG Metro Stars players
Florida Panthers players
Frankfurt Lions players
Hamburg Freezers players
Houston Aeros (1994–2013) players
Hull Olympiques players
Ice hockey people from Buffalo, New York
EC KAC players
Living people
Louisville Panthers players
National Hockey League first-round draft picks
SC Rapperswil-Jona Lakers players
Rochester Americans players
Wilkes-Barre/Scranton Penguins players
Winnipeg Jets scouts